Pastitsio (pastítsio) is a Greek baked pasta dish with ground meat and béchamel sauce, with variations of the dish found in other countries of the Mediterranean Sea.

Name and origin

Pastitsio takes its name from the Italian pasticcio, a large family of baked savory pies that may be based on meat, fish, or pasta, with many documented recipes from the early 16th century, and continuing to modern times. Italian versions include a pastry crust; some include béchamel.

The word pasticcio is attested by the 16th century as "any manner of pastie or pye" and comes from the vulgar Latin word pastīcium derived from pasta, and means "pie", and has developed the figurative meanings of "a mess", "a tough situation", or a pastiche.

In Egypt, it is called macarona béchamel.

In the Albanian-speaking regions of the Balkans, the dish is called pastiçe, deriving from pasticcio. It is, however, often meatless and made with an egg and cheese mixture instead of béchamel.

Among Turks and Turkish Cypriots, this dish is known as fırında makarna (literally, "macaroni in the oven").

Greece 

The most recent and most popular contemporary variant of pastitsio was invented by Nikolaos Tselementes, a French-trained Greek chef of the early 20th century.  Before him, pastitsio in Greece had a filling of pasta, liver, meat, eggs, and cheese, did not include béchamel, and was wrapped in filo, similar to the most Italian pasticcio recipes, which were wrapped in pastry: "he completely changed the dish and made it a kind of au gratin".

The Tselementes version—which is now ubiquitous—has a bottom layer that is bucatini or other tubular pasta, with cheese or egg as a binder; a middle layer of ground beef, or a mix of ground beef and ground pork with tomato sauce, cinnamon and cloves. Other spices like nutmeg or allspice are used in the top layer that is a béchamel or a mornay sauce. Grated goat cheese is often sprinkled on top. Pastitsio is a common dish, and is often served as a main course, with a salad.

Egypt
The Egyptian version is called  makarōna beshamel in Egyptian Arabic, i.e. "macaroni with béchamel". The dish is typically made with penne or macaroni pasta, a minced-meat sauce with tomato and onion, and a white sauce often enriched with Rumi cheese. Egg or cheese (cheddar and mozzarella) may also be baked on top. The dish was introduced to Egypt by Greek and Italian immigrants in the 19th century.

Malta
In Malta, timpana (the name probably derived from timballo) is made by tossing parboiled macaroni in a tomato sauce containing a small amount of minced beef or corned beef, bound with a mixture of raw egg and grated cheese. Hard-boiled eggs are sometimes added. The macaroni is then enclosed in a pastry case or lid before being baked. A similar dish without the pastry casing is imqarrun.

See also

 Moussaka
 Lasagna
 Timballo
 Chili mac
 List of casserole dishes
 List of pasta dishes
 Elder Pastitsios
 Su böreği
 Etli makarna

References

Sources
 
	

Casserole dishes
Cypriot cuisine
Greek cuisine
Maltese cuisine
Turkish cuisine
Egyptian cuisine
Pasta dishes
Macaroni dishes
Ground meat